Thierry Schmitter (born 6 May 1969, in France) is a Dutch sailor (now sited kite boarder) who was selected as Dutch Disabled Sportsman / woman of the Year in 2011. Thierry Schmitter won a bronze medal in sailing Mixed 2.4mR in Sailing at the 2004 Summer Paralympics and came fifth in the same category in Sailing at the 2008 Summer Paralympics. He also won a bronze medal at the Paralympics of London in 2012.

Thierry Schmitter is an examiner at the European Patent Office in The Hague, in the field of Marine Technology.

Thierry is now sited kite boarder. For more information see his website: www.sitkite.com

References

1969 births
Living people
Paralympic sailors of the Netherlands
Dutch male sailors (sport)
Sailors at the 2004 Summer Paralympics
Paralympic bronze medalists for the Netherlands
Sailors at the 2008 Summer Paralympics
Sailors at the 2012 Summer Paralympics
2.4 Metre class sailors
Medalists at the 2004 Summer Paralympics
Medalists at the 2008 Summer Paralympics
Medalists at the 2012 Summer Paralympics
Paralympic medalists in sailing
21st-century Dutch people